The Lewis Kayton House, also known as the Mansion on Forsyth Park, is a historic five-star hotel at 700 Drayton Street, Savannah, Georgia. It is significant as it was once the home of Lewis Kayton, who was an early pioneer to Savannah in the 19th century. The hotel occupies the Drayton block of the Forsyth Park and is part of the Savannah Historic District. The hotel is now owned by hotel developer Richard C. Kessler, Chairman and CEO of The Kessler Enterprise, Inc.

History

The Lewis Kayton House was built of brick and Terracotta, between 1888 and 1889, to designs by architects Alfred Eichberg and Hyman Witcover for Lewis Kayton (1843–1921), who was a businessman from Baltimore, Maryland. The cost was $45,000. Kayton came to Savannah, Georgia after the American Civil War. He died on August 26, 1921, in Savannah and is buried in the city's historic  Bonaventure Cemetery.

The house changed hands several times. It became the Fox & Weeks funeral home in 1953, which lasted for over fifty years.

The former Kayton mansion was converted into a lounge and restaurant that includes a cooking school. The three-story hotel was built onto the mansion with the same exterior style. There is an art gallery and outdoor patio with a pool. The hotel is owned and managed by Kessler Enterprise, Inc.

See also
 List of hotels in the United States
 List of National Historic Landmarks in Georgia (U.S. state)
 National Register of Historic Places listings in Georgia
 Buildings in Savannah Historic District
 Forsyth Park

References

External links

 Official Website

Hotels in Savannah, Georgia
Hotel buildings completed in 1889
Hotels established in 1889
1889 establishments in Georgia (U.S. state)
Savannah Historic District